Sílvia Alberto (born 18 May 1981) is a Portuguese television presenter and actress, currently employed by Rádio e Televisão de Portugal. She began her career in 2000, presenting Clube Disney on RTP1.

She was one of the hosts of the 2018 Eurovision Song Contest in Lisbon, Portugal.

Early life
She studied Theatre at the Lisbon Theatre and Film School.

Career

Alberto is best known for hosting seven editions of Festival da Canção (Portuguese heats for the Eurovision Song Contest), Dança Comigo (Portuguese version of Strictly Come Dancing), Operação Triunfo, MasterChef, Top Chef and presenting the RTP talent programme Aqui há talento.

She also had a three year stint with the broadcaster SIC, where she co-hosted the first two series of Ídolos and the 2004 Portuguese Golden Globes.

On 8 January 2018, she was announced as one of the four hosts of the 2018 Eurovision Song Contest alongside Filomena Cautela, Daniela Ruah, and Catarina Furtado.

See also
 List of Eurovision Song Contest presenters

References

External links

1981 births
Living people
Actresses from Lisbon
Portuguese television presenters
Portuguese television personalities
Portuguese television actresses
Portuguese game show hosts
Lisbon Theatre and Film School alumni
Portuguese women television presenters